Leon George Turrou (September 14, 1895 – December 10, 1986) was an American special agent and translator with the Federal Bureau of Investigation who was tasked with leading an investigation that located and interrogated Nazi German spies within the United States. He also became the author of a popular book at its time called Nazi Spies in America. His writings were adapted into the film, Confessions of a Nazi Spy.

Early life 
Turrou was born on September 14, 1895, in Kobryn in the Russian Empire. He became an orphan at a very young age with his father passing away about six months before his birth, and his mother not long after his birth. He was later adopted by a wealthy tradesman and spent a majority of his youth travelling around the world. At the age of 18, he moved to the United States where he found a job working as a translator for The New York Times due to his multi-linguistic skills.

From 1916 to 1920, Turrou served with the French Army and was soon sent to fight on Eastern Front. He was wounded in an engagement with the Germans. In 1928, after going through a list of occupations, he was eventually hired by the Federal Bureau of Investigation headed by J. Edgar Hoover at the time. It was through this appointment that he became an FBI Special Agent responsible for locating and arresting Nazi German spies in America.

Career 
After working with the Federal Bureau of Investigation for about 10 years from 1928 to 1938, Leon G. Turrou led the investigation into a Nazi spy ring operation in 1938. Although three Nazi spies were convicted and imprisoned and Turrou became famous, he deeply disappointed the FBI for leaking information about the case to the New York press and writing a series of articles about the case for a newspaper.

During his interrogation of the spies he told them they would have to testify before a grand jury, which led to many of them fleeing the country, so that four times as many spies escaped as were captured. The FBI today considers him to have bungled the case. Turrou was fired from the FBI in June 1938. During the trial itself, which took place in October 1938, his testimony was impeached by the defence using the accusations of seeking to make money and fame from the case, as well as allegations of witness tampering and even taking a bribe from Greibl. The allegations did not stand up, but the FBI thought Turrou had made the organization look amateurish, unable to defend the nation against espionage. He served with U.S. Army as a Lieutenant Colonel from 1943 to 1946 during World War II. He settled in France and became a leader in the American veteran expatriate community, and also was employed by J. Paul Getty as his personal security chief until his retirement in 1955. He died on December 10, 1986 in Paris, France.

During his investigation, Turrou used polygraph tests to interview his suspects, perhaps the first of its use by the FBI in an espionage investigation. The subjects of his investigation were Martin Schade, Captain William Drechsel, Karl Friedrich Wilhelm Herrmann, John Baptiste Unkel, Kate Moog and Dr. Ignatz Theodor Griebl. Turrou's newspaper articles were used as the basis of the film, Confessions of a Nazi Spy.

References

External links 
 

20th-century American people
1895 births
1986 deaths
United States Army personnel of World War II
Commandeurs of the Légion d'honneur
Emigrants from the Russian Empire to the United States
Federal Bureau of Investigation agents
French military personnel of World War I
Naturalized citizens of the United States
People from Kobrinsky Uyezd
People from Kobryn
Soldiers of the French Foreign Legion
The New York Times people
20th-century American translators
United States Army colonels